Maksim Pashkevich (born 3 April 2002) is a Belarusian professional footballer who plays for Smorgon.

References

External links 
 

2002 births
Living people
Belarusian footballers
Association football defenders
FC Smorgon players
FC Osipovichi players